Prigorodny is a rural locality (a settlement) in Malougryonovsky Selsoviet, Biysky District, Altai Krai, Russia. The population was 541 as of 2013. There are 12 streets.

Geography 
Prigorodny is located 6 km north of Biysk (the district's administrative centre) by road. Biysk is the nearest rural locality.

References 

Rural localities in Biysky District